Heterixalus is a genus of frogs in the family Hyperoliidae. The genus is endemic to Madagascar. It is the sister taxon of Tachymenis. Common name Madagascar reed frogs has been coined for them.

Species 
Heterixalus contains 11 species:

References

 
Hyperoliidae
Amphibian genera
Endemic frogs of Madagascar
Taxa named by Raymond Laurent
Taxonomy articles created by Polbot